Šantić is a surname. Notable people with the surname include:

 Aleksa Šantić (1868–1924), Bosnian Serb poet
 Tony Šantić (born 1952), noted Australian thoroughbred owner and tuna farmer

→ Šantić (Santic) Noble family

Croatian surnames
Serbian surnames